Sanford Stephen Ryan (June 29, 1855 – May 9, 1933) was a Canadian politician. He served in the Legislative Assembly of New Brunswick from 1900 to 1908 as an independent member.

References 

1855 births
1933 deaths